Bobakilandy is a rural municipality in Madagascar.  It belongs to the district of Antsiranana II, which is a part of Diana Region.   

It is situated next to the Montagne d'Ambre National Park.

References

Populated places in Diana Region